Gamboula is a town located in the Central African Republic prefecture of Mambéré-Kadéï.

History 
On 28 December 2020 Gamboula was captured by rebels from Coalition of Patriots for Change. It was recaptured by government forces on 7 March 2021.

References 

Sub-prefectures of the Central African Republic
Populated places in the Central African Republic
Populated places in Mambéré-Kadéï